Märt-Matis Lill (born 6 November 1975) is an Estonian composer.

Märt-Matis Lill was born in Tartu, the son of writer, translator, cultural critic and philosopher Jaan Kaplinski and classical philologist and translator Anne Lill. Guitarist and violinist Emil Lansoo was his grandfather.

He studied composition at the Tallinn Music High School under Lepo Sumera. In 1999 he graduated from Estonian Academy of Music and Theatre.

He has been the artistic director of the Pärnu New Music Days Festival.

From 2000, he is a member of Estonian Composers' Union. From 2014, he is the chairman of Estonian Composers' Union.

Works

 1999 "Üleminekuriitus" ("Le rite de passage")
 2001 "Seitse laulu sügisest" (for baritone and piano)
 2002 "Linnujäljed taeval"
 2002 "Etnofuturistlikud etüüdid"
 2003 "Farwell"
 2003 "Taeva jõgi" (for chamber orchestra)
 2015 "Kui kivid olid veel pehmed"
 2017 opera "Tulleminek"

References

Living people
1975 births
21st-century Estonian composers
Estonian Academy of Music and Theatre alumni
People from Tartu